Tai Wo Hau is a place in Tsuen Wan across Tsuen Wan District and Kwai Tsing District. Its area mainly includes Tai Wo Hau Estate, Kwai Yin Court, Kwai Yung Court, and private buildings along Texaco Road. It also includes Kwok Shui Road (the villages, MTR Tai Wo Hau station, Primrose Hill) at the north of Castle Peak Road.

Education
Tai Wo Hau is in Primary One Admission (POA) School Net 65, which includes multiple aided schools (schools operated independently of the government but funded with government money); none of the schools in the net are government schools.

Others
 Tai Wo Hau Estate
 Tai Wo Hau station
 Ham Tin Tsuen
 Ho Pui Tsuen
 Hoi Pa New Village
 Kwan Mun Hau Tsuen
 Yeung Uk Tsuen

References

Further reading

Places in Hong Kong
Kwai Chung
Tsuen Wan